The Wayans family is an American show-business family. Family members include Keenen Ivory Wayans, Shawn Wayans, Marlon Wayans, Damon Wayans Sr., Kim Wayans, Damon Wayans Jr., Damien Dante Wayans, and Chaunté Wayans. Works created by Wayans family members include the Scary Movie film series, The Wayans Bros., In Living Color, Don't Be a Menace, White Chicks, My Wife and Kids, and Little Man.

Family members

Progenitors 
Howell Stouten Wayans (born August 26, 1936), a supermarket manager, and his wife Elvira Alethia (née Green, July 23, 1938 – July 22, 2020), a homemaker and social worker, resided in Chelsea, New York City when they had their first child. Howell was a devout Jehovah's Witness.

Descendants
 Dwayne Howell Wayans (July 20, 1956) is a former writer and film-score composer.
 Keenen Ivory Desuma Wayans (born June 8, 1958) is an actor, comedian, director, and writer.
 Daphne Sharmaine Denise Polk, married in 2001 and divorced in 2005.
 Jolie Ivory Imani Wayans (born July 3, 1992).
 Nala Ivory Yasmeen Wayans (born April 30, 1996) is a model.
 Keenen Ivory Desuma Wayans, Jr. (born July 19, 1998) is a stand-up comedian.
 Bella Ivory Aziza Wayans (born November 23, 2001).
 Daphne Ivory Shiva Wayans (born June 11, 2003).
 Brittany Ann Daniel, couple since 2007 and separated in 2014.
 Diedra Lenora Wayans (born August 17, 1959) is a screenwriter and producer.
 Unknown man
 Craig Mikel Wayans (born March 27, 1976) is an actor, writer, and television producer. 
 Jordan Denacy Wayans (born June 19, 1997), daughter of Craig.
 Olivia Rae Jackson (born May 14, 2021), daughter of Jordan.
 Harlem Lewis Wayans (born November 21, 2001), daughter of Craig.
 Damon Kyle Wayans (born September 4, 1960) is a stand-up comedian, actor, writer, and producer.
 Lisa Marie Thorner, married in 1984 and divorced in 2000.
 Damon Kyle Wayans, Jr. (born November 18, 1982) is an actor and comedian.
 Michael Richard Wayans (born March 28, 1985) is an actor.
 Cara Mia Wayans (born April 18, 1987) is an actress and artist.
 Kimberly Nichole Wayans (born October 16, 1961) is a television and film actress.
 Kevin Austin Knotts, married to Kim since 2001.
 Elvira Alethia Wayans (born January 4, 1964) is a screenwriter and producer.
 Unknown man
 Damien Dante Wayans (born April 29, 1980) is an actor, screenwriter, producer and director.
 Ivory Snow Wayans (born June 26, 2020), daughter of Damien and Jordyn Renee.
 Chaunté Wayans (born May 24, 1982) is an actress and stand-up comedian.
 Nadia Yvette Wayans (born January 20, 1965) is an actress.
 Devonne Chaunté "Vonnie" Wayans (born April 25, 1966) is a screenwriter.
 Shawn Mathis Wayans (born January 19, 1971) is an actor, comedian, writer, and producer.
Ursula Alberto
Laila Wayans
Ilia Wayans
Marlon Wayans
 Marlon Lamont Wayans (born July 23, 1972) is an actor, comedian, writer, and producer.
 Angela Zackery, couple since 1992 and separated in 2013.
 Amai Zackery Wayans (born May 24, 2000).
 Shawn Howell Wayans (born February 3, 2002).

Works
Film and television productions with the involvement of more than one member of the Wayans family include:
 Hollywood Shuffle (1987), a film co-written by Keenen and featuring Keenen, Damon and Kim
 I'm Gonna Git You Sucka (1988), a film by Keenen also featuring Damon, Kim, Shawn and Marlon
 In Living Color (1990–1994), a sketch comedy show created by Keenen and Damon also featuring Kim, Shawn and Marlon
 Mo' Money (1992), a film written by Damon and starring Damon and Marlon
 Blankman (1994), a superhero parody film starring and co-written by Damon, featuring cameos by Damon's children
 A Low Down Dirty Shame (1994), a film by Keenen starring Keenen, also featuring Kim
 Major Payne (1995), co-written by, co-produced by and starring Damon and featuring Damien Dante Wayans
 The Wayans Bros. (1995–1999), a situation comedy starring brothers Shawn and Marlon
 Don't Be a Menace to South Central While Drinking Your Juice in the Hood (1996), co-written by and starring Shawn and Marlon, produced by Keenen (who also appears in the film)
 Waynehead (1996–1997), a short-lived animated series created by Damon with Shawn, Marlon and Kim
 Scary Movie (2000–2013), a film franchise created by Keenen, Shawn, and Marlon; the first installment was the most profitable movie ever to be directed by an African American, until the release of Fantastic Four in 2005. The Wayans were only involved with the first two films, but are still credited for the subsequent movies.
 My Wife and Kids (2001–2005) with Damon Wayans, which included Kim, Damien, Craig, Damon Jr. and Elvira among its writers, and featured many family members in guest roles
 White Chicks (2004), a film directed by Keenen, co-written and co-produced by Keenen, Shawn and Marlon, and starring Shawn and Marlon
 Little Man (2006), a film directed by Keenen, written and co-produced by Keenen, Shawn and Marlon, and starring Shawn and Marlon
 Thugaboo (2006), animated children's TV specials
 The Underground (2006), a sketch comedy show created by and starring Damon, featuring Damon Wayans Jr., with music by Dwayne Wayans
 Dance Flick (2009), a film directed by Damien Dante Wayans, written by many members of the family, and starring Damon Wayans Jr. and other Wayans family members
 Second Generation Wayans (2013), a TV show co-produced by and co-starring Damien and Craig

References

 
African-American families